Srpski Top Model Season 1 (Serbian Top Model) is the first Season of the reality documentary based on Tyra Banks' America's Next Top Model. 
It started on March 16, 2011 and featured 15 contestants who were fighting for the title of the new Serbian Top Model, as well as a modelling contract with Click Fashion Agency, the cover and editorials of Grazia magazine and an all-expenses trip to Israel, in hopes of a promising career start in the modeling industry.

Together with the panel of judges which includes photographer Miša Obradović and fashion expert Nenad Radujević she will evaluate the girls in a weekly judging session following eliminations until only three of them are left.

The cast has officially been released to the press on March 15. The show started airing on March 16, 2011 and finished on June 6. Eighteen-year-old Neda Stojanović from Novi Pazar won over Bojana Banjca and Milica Đorđević. During the show Neda was spotted by a French modelling scout backstage at Belgrade Fashion Week.

Contestants

(ages stated are at start of contest)

Summaries

Call-out order

 The contestant was eliminated
 The contestant was the original eliminee but was saved
 The contestant quit the competition
 The contestant won the competition

Episode 1 = Harper's Bazaar Cover In Group

Episode 2 (ET) = Different Sport Battle In Pairs

Episode 3 = Fashion Dress Between Two Cliffs With Hanging Elevator

Episode 4 (ET) = Antique Fashion Runaway

Episode 5 = Country Style In A Farm Village,New Face Coverlook,Top Model Aura Catwalk

Episode 6( ET) = Shio And Greek Zodiak Runaway

Episode 7 = Covershoot Of "Teenager's Fashion", Personality Of Motion Video

Episode 8 (ET) = Fashion in Different Colour,Rainbow Syle Fashion Of Avant Garde

Episode 9 = Cruella In Fashion,Catalog Fashion 

Episode 10 (ET) = Fashion Runaway,Personality High Fashionable Motin Video,Sport Catalogue

Episode 11 = Makeover Brand Video Commercial, "I Love Ikea" Commercial,Pantene Comercil Photo

Episode 12 (ET) = Degree Deodorant Commercial

Episode 13 = Fashion Mythology With Different Animal,Haute Couture In Construction

Episode 14 (ET) = Avant Garde Runaway And Party,Acting In Horror Short Motion Film

Episode 15 = Ninja Warrior Runaway

Episode 16 (ET)  = Punk Fashion In Group,Strong Dramatic Photoshoot,Photoshoot With Bat

Episode 17 = Wild Beauty In Bikini At Mangrove Jungle,Fresh Beauty In Ricefield,Hoi An Photo

Episode 18 (ET) = Vietnamese Culture Runway,Desert Warrior In Mui Ne,Tropical Sexy In Beach

Episode 19 = (Round 1 = Lake Side Fashion Runway) (Round 2 = Wild Runway Inside A Glass Box) (Round 3 = Downhill Runway Inside the Giant Ball After Skydiving) (Round 4 = Primitive Runaway Above The Mud in the mangrove forest) (Round 5 = High End Fahsion Runaway)

Episode 20 = (Round 1 = Vietnamese Magazine) (Round 2 = Elegance Romance,Glam Photoshoot) (Round 3 = Dramatic Evolution Photo In Dead Forest,Beauty In Lake With Swan)

Episode 21 = Create A New High Fashion,New Strong Fashion In Extreme Obstacle In Pairs

Episode 22 (ET) = Emotional Video,Vertical Runaway

Episode 24 = Cover Magazine In 2 Cover Vogue And 2 Cover Harper's Bazaar,Doucumenter Video Runway In Ladder Dimension,Mercy Ambassador

Photo shoot guide
 Episode 1 photo shoot: Pin-up girls
 Episode 2 photo shoot: Winds
 Episode 3 photo shoot: Draggy makeup snow white queen
 Episode 4 photo shoot: Underwater nymphs
 Episode 5 photo shoot: The simple life
 Episode 6 photo shoot: 40s classic beauty movie stars on Belgrade central station
 Episode 7 photo shoot: Battle with inner demons
 Episode 8 photo shoot: Jump!
 Episode 9 photo shoot: Bike, brides and fire
 Episode 10 photo shoot: Gender swap
 Episode 11 photo shoot: Seafood on the beach  
 Episode 13 photo shoot: Stuck in a spider web

References

External links
 Constantin Entertainment Production Website

Top Model
2011 Serbian television seasons
Lists of reality television series episodes
Television shows filmed in Belgrade
Television shows filmed in Switzerland
Television shows filmed in Germany
Television shows filmed in Montenegro